Mohamed Gamil El-Kalyoubi (born 7 April 1937) is an Egyptian former foil fencer. He competed at the 1960, 1964 and 1968 Summer Olympics. At the 1960 Games, he represented the United Arab Republic.

After his athletic career, he moved to the United States and served as the head fencing coach at Wellesley College until his retirement following the 2015 season.

References

External links
 

1937 births
Living people
Egyptian male foil fencers
Olympic fencers of Egypt
Fencers at the 1960 Summer Olympics
Fencers at the 1964 Summer Olympics
Fencers at the 1968 Summer Olympics
Sportspeople from Cairo
20th-century Egyptian people
21st-century Egyptian people